Frost at Christmas (1984) is the first of the series of novels written by R. D. Wingfield, the creator of the character Detective Inspector Jack Frost, who is more famously known in the television series A Touch of Frost, where the character is played by Sir David Jason. This novel was adapted into the TV episode 'Care and Protection', which was also the first in the series.

Plot
As Christmas approaches Detective Inspector Jack Frost is on the trail of a sensitive case with limited time to solve it. Tracy Uphill, an eight-year-old child, goes missing after attending Sunday school. It turns out her mother is a prostitute who couldn't meet her because she was with a client.

There are many suspects and characters to trouble DI Frost's mind including; the mother's client with a false alibi, the vicar with a penchant for pornography and a local psychic who claims she knows where to find the body of the young girl. At the same time other cases also need to be solved, as Frost's colleague DI Allen is suddenly rushed to hospital, leaving him alone to investigate some attempted break-ins at a local bank and a 30-year-old skeleton with a severed arm.

Detective Constable Clive Barnard, the nephew of the Chief Constable, is another problem Frost faces when the new detective is freshly-transferred to Denton and takes an immediate dislike to Frost's methods. While many believe that DC Barnard has only got into CID through his family connections and his all-knowing attitude does not help to improve his image, Frost eventually warms to the young cop and becomes his mentor.

1984 British novels
British crime novels